Julius Curtis Townsend (February 22, 1881 – December 28, 1939) was born in Missouri. He graduated from the United States Naval Academy in 1902. 

He received the Medal of Honor for actions at the United States occupation of Veracruz, 1914. He was awarded the Navy Cross and served in World War I.

Medal of Honor citation
Rank and organization: Lieutenant Organization: U.S. Navy Born:22 February 1881, Athens, Mo. Accredited to: Missouri Date of issue: 12/04/1915

Citation:

For distinguished conduct in battle, engagement of Vera Cruz, 22 April 1914. Lt. Townsend was eminent and conspicuous in command of his battalion. He exhibited courage and skill in leading his men through the action of the 22d and in the final occupation of the city.

See also

List of Medal of Honor recipients
List of Medal of Honor recipients (Veracruz)
List of United States Naval Academy alumni (Medal of Honor)

References

External links

1881 births
1939 deaths
Burials at Arlington National Cemetery
United States Navy Medal of Honor recipients
United States Naval Academy alumni
United States Navy admirals
Recipients of the Navy Cross (United States)
Battle of Veracruz (1914) recipients of the Medal of Honor